A total lunar eclipse will take place on March 25, 2043.

This lunar eclipse is the first of a tetrad, four total lunar eclipses in series. The last series was in 2032 and 2033, starting with an April 2032 lunar eclipse. The next tetrad series is in 2050 and 2051, starting with the May 2050 lunar eclipse.

Visibility

Related lunar eclipses

Lunar year series

Half-Saros cycle
A lunar eclipse will be preceded and followed by solar eclipses by 9 years and 5.5 days (a half saros). This lunar eclipse is related to two total solar eclipses of Solar Saros 130.

Tzolkinex 
 Preceded: Lunar eclipse of February 11, 2036

 Followed: Lunar eclipse of May 6, 2050

See also
List of lunar eclipses and List of 21st-century lunar eclipses

References

External links

2043-03
2043-03
2043 in science